The 2018 World RX of South Africa was the twelfth and final round of the fifth season of the FIA World Rallycross Championship. The event was held at the Killarney Motor Racing Complex in Cape Town, Western Cape.

Supercar 

Source

Heats

Semi-finals 

 Semi-Final 1

 Semi-Final 2

Final

Standings after the event 

Source

 Note: Only the top five positions are included.

References 

|- style="text-align:center"
|width="35%"|Previous race:2018 World RX of Germany
|width="40%"|FIA World Rallycross Championship2018 season
|width="35%"|Next race:2019 World RX of Abu Dhabi
|- style="text-align:center"
|width="35%"|Previous race:2017 World RX of South Africa
|width="40%"|World RX of South Africa
|width="35%"|Next race:2019 World RX of South Africa
|- style="text-align:center"

South Africa
World RX
2018 in South African sport